Cedrillas is a municipality located in the province of Teruel, Aragon, Spain. According to the 2018 census (INE), the municipality has a population of 630 inhabitants.

Demography

References

External links
Cedrillas on Diputación de Teruel

Municipalities in the Province of Teruel